Fred Popovici (born 27 July 1948) is a Romanian composer, writing mainly for orchestra. 

Popovici was born in Brăila, Romania, and studied at the Bucharest Academy of Music. Since his graduation in 1972, he has been a teacher and lecturer as well as having his works performed extensively both at home and abroad.

External links
 Biography and complete list of works

Romanian composers
1948 births
Living people
People from Brăila
National University of Music Bucharest alumni